Harry Cecil Parr (1914 – after 1939) was an English professional footballer who played in the Football League for Birmingham as a right half.

Parr was born in Newcastle upon Tyne. He  played local football in the Shropshire area before joining Birmingham in October 1937. He played only once for the first team, on 23 April 1938 in a 3–0 home defeat to Everton in the First Division. When the Football League was suspended at the start of the Second World War, Parr returned to junior competition.

References

1914 births
Year of death missing
Footballers from Newcastle upon Tyne
English footballers
Association football wing halves
Telford United F.C. players
Birmingham City F.C. players
Stafford Rangers F.C. players
English Football League players
Date of birth missing
Place of death missing